Greg Oliphant (born 22 June 1950) is an Australian former professional rugby league footballer, a state and national representative  who made one Kangaroo tour. Oliphant played in the New South Wales Rugby League for the two seasons of 1978-1979 with the  Balmain Tigers. Prior to and after those years he played in the Brisbane Rugby League with Wests, Valleys and Redcliffe.

He made his international debut off the reserve bench in the first Test of the 1978 domestic series against New Zealand  and then started in the 2nd Test. He was selected for the 1978 Kangaroo tour but played only four tour matches with his rival Tommy Raudonikis the selectors' preferred Test halfback. Oliphant and Raudonikis enjoyed a great club and state rivalry and regularly competed for national selection. Oliphant played in the inaugural State of Origin match for the Queensland Maroons. He later coached in the BRL premiership with Norths.

References

Queensland representatives at qrl.com.au
 Andrews, Malcolm (2006) The ABC of Rugby League Australian Broadcasting Corporation, Sydney

1950 births
Living people
Australian rugby league players
Wests Panthers players
Fortitude Valley Diehards players
Redcliffe Dolphins players
Queensland Rugby League State of Origin players
Balmain Tigers players
Australian rugby league coaches
Norths Devils coaches
Rugby league halfbacks
Australia national rugby league team players